Husband Factor is a 2015 Turkish comedy film directed by Kivanç Baruönü.

Cast 
 Ezgi Mola - Efsun
 Murat Yıldırım - Sinan
 Nevra Serezli - Peyker
  - Gonul
  - Nur

References

External links 

2015 romantic comedy films
Turkish romantic comedy films